Urazgildy (Uraźgilde) is a rural locality (a selo) in Novotatyshlinsky Selsoviet, Tatyshlinsky District, Bashkortostan, Russia. The population was 471 as of 2010. There are 6 streets.

Geography 
Urazgildy is located 5 km south of Verkhniye Tatyshly (the district's administrative centre) by road. Verkhniye Tatyshly is the nearest rural locality.

References 

Rural localities in Tatyshlinsky District